James Peter Pisoni (August 14, 1929 – February 4, 2007) was an American professional baseball player, a backup outfielder  in Major League Baseball. Pisoni played mainly as a center fielder for four teams between 1953 and 1960.

Pisoni will forever be known among baseball fans and historians as the last player to debut in a St. Louis Browns uniform. He was signed by the Browns before the 1949 season, but he spent two years in the military during the Korean War before joining St. Louis on September 25, 1953, becoming the last rookie to debut with the Browns before they moved to Baltimore and became the Orioles. He appeared in all three remaining games, including playing in the Browns closer on September 29. 
 
However, Pisoni never played for Baltimore. He went back to the minor leagues and three years later the Orioles traded him to the Kansas City Athletics. He played for them  from 1956 to 1957, before joining the Milwaukee Braves (1959) and New York Yankees (1959–60).

In a five-season career, Pisoni hit .212 (40-for-189) with six home runs and 20 RBI in 103 games, including 26 runs, three doubles and three triples. Following his baseball retirement, he worked as an electrical contractor.

Pisoni died in Dallas, Texas, at the age of 77.

References

Baseball Fever
Billy Martin - Baseballbiography.com
Historic Baseball
Retrosheet

1929 births
2007 deaths
American military personnel of the Korean War
American people of Italian descent
Anderson Rebels players
Baseball players from St. Louis
Denver Bears players
Kansas City Athletics players
Major League Baseball center fielders
Mayfield Clothiers players
Milwaukee Braves players
New York Yankees players
Pittsburg Browns players
Richmond Virginians (minor league) players
St. Louis Browns players
San Antonio Missions players
San Diego Padres (minor league) players
Vancouver Mounties players
Wichita Indians players
York White Roses players